Amateau is a surname. Notable people with the surname include:

Albert Jean Amateau (1889-1996), Turkish rabbi, businessman, lawyer, and social activist
Rod Amateau (1923-2003), American film and television screenwriter, director, and producer